James Patrick Caviezel Jr. (born September 26, 1968) is an American film and television actor who played Jesus Christ in The Passion of the Christ (2004) and starred as John Reese on the CBS series Person of Interest (2011–2016). He also has played roles such as Slov in G.I. Jane (1997), Private Witt in The Thin Red Line (1998), Detective John Sullivan in Frequency (2000), Catch in Angel Eyes (2001), and Edmond Dantès in The Count of Monte Cristo (2002).

Early life
Caviezel was born in Mount Vernon, Washington, the son of Margaret (née Lavery), a homemaker and former stage actress, and James Caviezel, a chiropractor. He has a younger brother, Timothy, and three sisters, Ann, Amy, and Erin. He was raised in a tight-knit Catholic family in Conway, Washington. His surname is Romansh. His father is of Slovak and Swiss descent, while his mother is Irish.

Career
Caviezel began acting in plays in Seattle, Washington. He earned his Screen Actors Guild card with a minor role in the 1991 film My Own Private Idaho. He then moved to Los Angeles to pursue a career in acting. When he decided to move, "people thought I was out of my mind," he said. He was offered a scholarship to study acting at New York's Juilliard School in 1993, but he turned it down to portray Warren Earp in the 1994 film Wyatt Earp. He later appeared in episodes of the TV series Murder, She Wrote and The Wonder Years. After appearing in G.I. Jane (1997), he had a breakthrough performance in the 1998 Terrence Malick-directed World War II film The Thin Red Line. He played Black John, a Missouri bushwhacker, in Ride with the Devil (1999), an American Civil War film.

Caviezel was originally cast to play Scott Summers / Cyclops in X-Men (2000), but dropped out because of a scheduling conflict with the film Frequency (2000). He starred in the mainstream films Pay It Forward (2000), The Count of Monte Cristo (2002), and Bobby Jones: Stroke of Genius (2004). In 2000, he played the lead role in Madison, a film about hydroplane racing in Madison, Indiana. The film was completed in 2001, but did not appear in theaters until a limited release in 2005. In 2002, he played a pivotal role in the film I Am David.

Caviezel portrayed Jesus Christ in Mel Gibson's 2004 film The Passion of the Christ. During filming, he was struck by lightning, accidentally scourged, had his shoulder dislocated, and suffered from pneumonia and hypothermia. Prior to filming, Gibson reportedly warned Caviezel that playing Jesus in his controversial film would hurt his acting career. In 2011, he claimed that good roles had been hard to come by since, but stated that this movie, in particular, the role of Jesus Christ, was a once-in-a-lifetime experience.

He had leading roles in the 2006 films Unknown and Déjà Vu. He played Kainan in Outlander (2008) and provided the voice of Jesus on the 2007 New Testament audio dramatization The Word of Promise. In 2008, he starred in Long Weekend.

In 2009, Caviezel played French-Iranian journalist Freidoune Sahebjam in The Stoning of Soraya M., a drama set in 1986 Iran about the execution of a young mother. When asked about how his Catholic faith was affected by this story, he said, "you don't have to go any further than the gospels to figure out what the right thing to do is, whether you should be more concerned helping someone regardless of their religion or where they're from". That same year, he reprised the role of Jesus in the latest installment of The Word of Promise. Caviezel starred in The Prisoner, a remake of the British science fiction series The Prisoner, in November 2009.
From 2011 to 2016, Caviezel starred in the CBS drama series Person of Interest as John Reese, a former CIA agent who now works for a mysterious billionaire as a vigilante. The show received the highest ratings in 15 years for a series pilot and consistently garnered over 10 million weekly viewers. Caviezel was nominated for the People's Choice Award for Favorite Dramatic TV Actor in 2014 and again in 2016 for his work on Person of Interest.

Caviezel starred in the 2014 football film When the Game Stands Tall as De La Salle High School coach Bob Ladouceur, whose Concord, California Spartans prep team had a 151-game winning streak from 1992 to 2003, an American sporting record. He appeared in the 2013 film Escape Plan, playing a warden who maintains order in the world's most secret and secure prison.

Caviezel narrated two documentaries in 2016 regarding Christianity. One was Liberating a Continent: John Paul II and the Fall of Communism and the other was The Face of Mercy. In an interview about the former film, he stated that John Paul II had crushed communism "with love".

In 2017, Caviezel signed on as lead character of CBS's SEAL Team series. However, Caviezel left the project due to creative differences before production began and was replaced by David Boreanaz.

Caviezel portrayed the Apostle Luke in the film Paul, Apostle of Christ, which opened in theaters on March 23, 2018, to mixed reviews.

In January 2018, Caviezel's agent announced that Caviezel had signed on with Mel Gibson to reprise his role as Jesus in The Passion of the Christ sequel, entitled The Resurrection of the Christ. In September 2020, Caviezel said, "Mel Gibson just sent me the third picture, the third draft. It’s coming." He added, "It’s going to be the biggest film in world history."

In 2018, Caviezel signed on to portray Tim Ballard, a self-styled anti-human trafficking activist, in the movie Sound of Freedom. The movie tells the story of the organization Operation Underground Railroad (O.U.R.) and its mission to save children from sex trafficking and slavery. Ballard had specifically requested that Caviezel play him in the film. Caviezel stated, "This is the second most important film I have ever done since 'The Passion of the Christ'... It's going to affect the saving of a lot of children and the changing of lives. It will also bring a lot of light into the darkness."

Caviezel starred in the 2020 thriller film Infidel as Doug Rawlins.

Personal life
Caviezel is a devout Catholic. In a 2017 interview, Caviezel talked about the importance of his Catholic faith, the lasting impact that The Passion of the Christ has had on his life, and his special devotion to the Virgin Mary. During the filming of The Passion of the Christ in Italy, he received daily counsel, Confession, and Holy Communion from a local Catholic priest, with an interpreter. Caviezel has been a featured public speaker at religious venues since the release of The Passion of the Christ. On March 19, 2005, he was the spokesman for the first Catholic Men's Conference in Boston. 

In 1996, Caviezel married Kerri Browitt, a high school English teacher. They have adopted three children from China who had cancer. His sister-in-law, Kristen, is the wife of former St. Louis Rams head coach Scott Linehan.

Out of respect for his wife, Caviezel requested that he wear a shirt and that Jennifer Lopez wear a top during a love scene in the film Angel Eyes, and he refused to strip in a love scene with Ashley Judd in High Crimes. He said, "I do love scenes—but not ones with gratuitous sex. I also don’t do gratuitous violence. And it's not just about my wife, although that's important. It's sin, pure and simple. I mean, it's wrong."

Political views 
Caviezel publicly opposes abortion. In 2006, Caviezel was featured with actress Patricia Heaton and Missouri athletes Kurt Warner and Mike Sweeney in an advertisement opposing Missouri Constitutional Amendment 2, which allowed any form of embryonic stem cell research and therapy in Missouri that is otherwise legal under federal law. He began the advertisement by saying, "Le-bar nash be-neshak" (Aramaic for "You betray the Son of Man with a kiss"), a reference to Judas's betrayal of Jesus Christ and a phrase used in the Gospel According to St. Luke. (In the advertisement, the line did not include a translation into English.) Caviezel closed the commercial with the line, "You know now. Don't do it. Vote no on 2." The advertisement was a response to a commercial featuring Michael J. Fox, who favored embryonic stem cell research.

In 2021, Caviezel endorsed some elements of the far-right QAnon conspiracy theory during a remote appearance at the "Health and Freedom Conference" in Broken Arrow, Oklahoma. The appearance was to promote the film Sound of Freedom, centering on self-styled anti-human trafficking activist Timothy Ballard. Ballard's activism has been alleged to correspond to the rise of QAnon-related conspiracy theories, though he denies any connection to the movement. Caviezel mentioned that Ballard was supposed to be appearing at the conference but was "saving victims of trafficking" who were victims of "adrenochroming". Caviezel suggested he had seen evidence of children being subjected to the practice, which is a core belief of QAnon. The event included appearances by other QAnon promoters, such as L. Lin Wood and Michael Flynn. In October of the same year, Caviezel spoke in Las Vegas at the QAnon-adjacent "For God & Country: Patriot Double Down" conference, where he mentioned the need to fight child sex trafficking, Satan and liberal values. He claimed that "the storm is upon us", echoing QAnon's belief in a final battle against evil and repeated the battle cry of William Wallace in Braveheart, also urging the audience to "[send] Lucifer and his henchmen straight back to hell where they belong".

Filmography

Film

Television

Documentary

References

External links

Jim Caviezel at Instagram
 
 Jim Caviezel at AllMovie
 

1968 births
Living people
20th-century American male actors
20th-century Roman Catholics
21st-century American male actors
21st-century Roman Catholics
American conspiracy theorists
American male film actors
American male television actors
American people of Irish descent
American people of Slovak descent
American people of Romansh descent
Male actors from Seattle
Male actors from Washington (state)
People from Burien, Washington
People from Mount Vernon, Washington
Bellevue College alumni
University of Notre Dame alumni
University of Washington alumni
Catholics from Washington (state)